The 2009 Torneio Internacional Cidade de São Paulo was the FIRST edition of the Torneio Internacional Cidade de São Paulo de Futebol Feminino, an invitational women's football tournament held annually in Brazil. It began on 9 December and ended on 20 December 2009.

Format
The four invited teams were in. In the first phase, the teams played each other within the group in a single round. The two teams with the most points earned in the respective group, were qualified for the next phase.

In the final stage, the first and second teams placed in Group. Played only one match, becoming the champion, the winner team. If the match ends in a tie, will be considered champion, the team with the best campaign in the first phase.

The third and fourth teams placed in the group. Played in one game, becoming the third-placed, the winner team. If the match ends in a tie, will be considered champion, the team with the best campaign in the first phase.

Teams
Listed are the confirmed teams.

Group stage
All times are local

Group A

Knockout stage

Third place match

Final

Final results

Goalscorers

7 goals
 Marta

3 goals
 Cristiane

2 goals
 Fabiana
 Érika
 Ma Xiaoxu
 Dinora Garza
 Guadalupe "Lupita" Worbis
 Renae Cuellar

References

External links
Official Site (in Portuguese)
Brazilian National Team All Matches (in Portuguese)

2009
2009 in women's association football
2009 in Brazilian women's football
2009 in Chilean football
2009–10 in Mexican football
2009 in Chinese football
2009 in Mexican women's sports